Cañuelas Fútbol Club is an Argentine football club from the city of Cañuelas in Buenos Aires Province. The team currently plays in Primera C Metropolitana, the fourth division of the Argentine football league system.

External links
La Web del Cañuelas 
Cañuelas blog 

 
Association football clubs established in 1911
Football clubs in Buenos Aires Province
1911 establishments in Argentina